Main, Meri Patni Aur Woh (English: Me, My Wife and Him) is a 2005 Indian romantic comedy film, directed by Chandan Arora, starring Rajpal Yadav, Rituparna Sengupta and Kay Kay Menon as the leading actors. The film released on 7 October 2005. The story was loosely based on the 1989 Malayalam movie Vadakkunokkiyantram. Singer Mohit Chauhan used his song Guncha Koi from his album 'Sapney' in this movie.

Plot
The movie is about a qualified but short, middle-aged man named Mithilesh (Rajpal Yadav) and his insecurities about his height & personality, when he marries Veena (Rituparna Sengupta). He had never imagined such a pretty and well grounded woman would marry a commoner. As his married life progresses with his devoted wife, his insecurities continue to grow. He becomes jealous of his friend Saleem, (Varun Badola), Veena's childhood friend Akash, (Kay Kay Menon) and others who he claims are infatuated. Slowly, he suspects a change in Veena's behavior and starts believing she wants a divorce. Being a loving husband he confesses his fear to Veena. But the hidden truth, disclosed at the very end, ultimately brings the couple closer.

Cast
Rajpal Yadav as Mithilesh 'Chhotey Babu' Shukla
Rituparna Sengupta as Veena M. Shukla (née Tiwari)
Vinod Nagpal as Advocate Kishorilal Mishra
Varun Badola as Saleem
Kay Kay Menon as Akash
Naseeruddin Shah as The Narrator 
Abdul Basir as Abdul Basir
Anil Rastogi

Soundtrack

Critical reception
The film garnered mostly positive reviews from both critics and audiences with people praising the non-clichéd plot, subtle cinematography and Rajpal's realistic portrayal of an insecure, self-conscious man.

References

External links

2005 films
2000s Hindi-language films
2005 romantic comedy films
Indian romantic comedy films
UTV Motion Pictures films
Films shot in Lucknow